Esoteric Emotions – The Death of Ignorance is the debut demo album by the British doom metal band Esoteric. Noted for its usage of effects pedals, something not commonly used in metal music up to that point in time, the demo would obtain the attention of independent label Aesthetic Death, who issued the band's first two albums Epistemological Despondency and The Pernicious Enigma. The demo was released by the band in small runs on cassette only, and in 2000 it was reissued on CD-R through the band, though bootlegged versions exist of this edition. The demo would see an official CD release in 2017 through Aesthetic Death Records as part of the band's 25th anniversary.

A common misconception is that the band's name was Esoteric Emotions when it was released, however vocalist Greg Chandler has stated that "Esoteric Emotions" was meant to be only part of the title.

Track listing
Side A

Side B

Credits
Esoteric
Bryan Beck – Bass, fretless Bass, effects and bass synth
Gordon Bicknell – Lead guitar, effects, samples, synthesizer
Greg Chandler – Vocals, effects
Simon – Lead Guitar, effects, samples
Stuart Blenkinsopp – Guitar, effects
Darren – Drums

Production
Alex Tepper - engineering, mixing

References

External links
Esoteric Emotions - The Death of Ignorance on Bandcamp
Esoteric Emotions - The Death of Ignorance on Discogs

1993 albums
Esoteric (band) albums